Udny Station  is a small village in Aberdeenshire, Scotland. It is 8 miles east of Oldmeldrum and 5 miles south west of Ellon. It is part of the parish of Foveran.

Udny Station was a station on the Formartine and Buchan line to Fraserburgh. The tracks were removed in the early 1980s, just as the oil boom was getting into full swing.

There was a goods yard with railway sidings at the station. The sidings were in the area where a number of newer houses have been built. Walking along the track of the old platform, one of the original lighting units (minus the glass) is still visible mounted on a concrete post.  About a mile south of the station, on the old track, walkers pass old level crossing gates which are still fitted showing the orange round plate.

On the eastern edge of the village, whilst heading for Cultercullen, just as you leave the village is a field with a fenced-off area showing air vents. This was a Royal Observer Corps station. Through an access hatch, there are rooms under here used during the Cold War by the ROC.  There are a number of these stations spread across the country, most were taken out of service in 2001. The rooms house some communications equipment, however the Udny Station one has been almost stripped of everything inside. Prior to this, during WWII, a wooden hut existed there for the ROC. The bunker was removed and filled in by the current landowner, and no longer visible

Near Tillycorthie house, just beside the railway line, about 200 yards south from the Railway bridge are a clump of trees.  Between those trees and Corthiemuir Farm, 15 HE bombs were dropped straddling the railway line.  One of the 15 failed to explode.  In addition to this, 20 incendiary bombs were dropped setting fire to the grain store at the farm.

A number of the farms in the area used prisoners of war as labour, these were supplied from the POW camp in Pitmedden. The camp entrance is a bridge now leading to a housing estate on the south side of Pitmedden, about 100 yards from the Aberdeen/Tarves road junction beside the church.

Footnotes

Villages in Aberdeenshire